Finneytown is a census-designated place (CDP) in Springfield Township, Hamilton County, in southwest Ohio, United States, just north of Cincinnati. The population was 12,399 at the 2020 census. Finneytown is home to the largest private school in Ohio (St. Xavier High School) and the Cincinnati area's annual Greek Festival (at Holy Trinity-St. Nicholas Greek Orthodox Church).

History
Finneytown is named for Ebenezer Ward Finney, a Revolutionary War soldier whose burial site is located just south of the current township.  The land was originally purchased from John Cleves Symmes by Rev. Ebenezer Ward, and given to his grandson Ebenezer Ward Finney.

Geography
Finneytown is located at  (39.217059, -84.521513).

Demographics

2010 census
The population was 12,741 at the U.S. 2010 census, in 5,294 housing units.  The racial makeup of the CDP was 61.7% White, 33.7% Black, 1.9% Hispanic, with others 1% or less.

2000 census
As of the census of 2000, there were 13,492 people, 5,194 households, and 3,807 families residing in the CDP. The population density was 3,382.8 people per square mile (1,305.6/km2).  There were 5,336 housing units at an average density of 1,337.9/sq mi (516.4/km2).  The racial makeup was 72.95% White, 23.83% African American, 0.16% Native American, 1.10% Asian, 0.01% Pacific Islander, 0.45% from other races, and 1.48% from two or more races. Hispanic or Latino of any race were 0.80% of the population.

There were 5,194 households, out of which 34.6% had children under the age of 18 living with them, 55.7% were married couples living together, 14.6% had a female householder with no husband present, and 26.7% were non-families. 23.9% of all households were made up of individuals, and 10.7% had someone living alone who was 65 years of age or older. The average household size was 2.57 and the average family size was 3.04.

In the CDP, the population was spread out, with 27.6% under the age of 18, 6.1% from 18 to 24, 26.3% from 25 to 44, 22.9% from 45 to 64, and 17.1% who were 65 years of age or older. The median age was 38 years. For every 100 females, there were 87.9 males. For every 100 females age 18 and over, there were 80.3 males.

The median income for a household in the CDP was $52,219, and the median income for a family had been $58,393. Males had a median income of $41,932 versus $31,250 for females. The per capita income for the CDP was $25,355. About 4.3% of families and 5.9% of the population were below the poverty line, including 7.5% of those under age 18 and 4.1% of those age 65 or over.

Education

Public School District
The Finneytown Local School District serves the neighborhood and surrounding area. The district has 2 schools that are divided by grades. They include: Finneytown Elementary (K-6) and the Junior/Senior High or Secondary Campus (7-12).

Private Schools
There are four private schools within Finneytown:
 John Paul II (K-8)
 St Vivians (K-8)
 Central Baptist (K-8)
 St Xavier High School (9-12)

As of 2016, St. Xavier is the largest private school in Ohio.

Finneytown is also home to the Cincinnati College of Mortuary Science.

Culture

Finneytown is the home of the annual Panegyri Greek Festival, one of the largest annual ethnic food celebrations in the Cincinnati area.  The Holy Trinity-Saint Nicholas Greek Orthodox Church started the yearly festival in 1975. It has included authentic Greek food, music, dancing, and an art show. The festival has been held during June in recent years.

In popular culture
 Pringles potato crisps were named after Pringle Drive, a street in Finneytown.
Goat, a movie starring Nick Jonas started being filmed on May 4, 2015 in Finneytown.

Notable people
 Darius Bazley, professional basketball player
 Amanda Borden, 1996 Olympic gold medallist in gymnastics
 Charley Harper, artist
 Joe Hudepohl, 1992 and 1996 Olympic gold medalist in swimming
 Jeffrey R. Immelt, chairman of the board and chief executive officer of General Electric
 Justin Jeffre, member of the band 98 Degrees
 James Michael Lafferty, CEO of Fine Hygienic Holding; former regional CEO of Procter & Gamble, Coca-Cola and British-American Tobacco. Olympic Track and Field coach
 Marco Marsan, author
 Mark Trueblood, engineer and astronomer
 Donavon Clark, Football Player

References

External links
 Springfield Township
 Winton Woods City School District
 Finneytown Local School District

Census-designated places in Hamilton County, Ohio
Census-designated places in Ohio